Miss USA 1956 was the 5th Miss USA pageant, held on July 18, 1956, at Long Beach Municipal Auditorium, Long Beach, California. From the 43 contestants Miss Iowa USA, Carol Morris, won the competition and later became Miss Universe. She became the first contestant from Iowa to win the Miss USA competition. She was crowned by Miss USA 1955, Carlene King Johnson of Vermont.

One of the runners-up, Charlene Holt of Maryland, became an actress, appearing on television series and in films including El Dorado with John Wayne.

Placements

Delegates

Historical significance 
 Iowa wins competition for the first time. Also becoming in the 5th state who does it for the first time. Incidentally, Morris went on to become the second woman from the USA to win the Miss Universe title in 1956.
 South Carolina earns the 1st runner-up position for the second time. The last time it placed this was in 1953. Also this reaches the highest placement since Miriam Stevenson won in 1954. Incidentally, Stevenson went on to become the first woman from the USA to win the Miss Universe title in 1954.
 Arkansas earns the 2nd runner-up position for the first time.
 Nebraska earns the 3rd runner-up position for the first time.
 Texas earns the 4th runner-up position for the first time.
 States that placed in semifinals the previous year were Arkansas, Colorado, Nebraska, South Carolina,  Texas and Washington.
 Nebraska, South Carolina and Texas placed for the fourth consecutive year.
 Arkansas placed for the third consecutive year.
 Colorado and Washington made their second consecutive placement.
 Iowa, Maryland, New Jersey and Ohio last placed in 1954.
 Utah last placed in 1953.
 Michigan and Tennessee last placed in 1952.
 North Carolina and Oregon placed for the first time.
 New York City, and Wisconsin break an ongoing streak of placements since 1954.
 California and Illinois break an ongoing streak of placements since 1953.
 New York breaks an ongoing streak of placements since 1952.

See also 
Miss Universe 1956
Miss World 1956

External links
Miss USA official website

1956
1956 in the United States
1956 beauty pageants
1956 in California
1956